The News Minute is an Indian digital news platform based in Bangalore, Karnataka. It was founded by Dhanya Rajendran, Chitra Subramaniam and Vignesh Vellore in 2014. Apart from Karnataka, it also has bureaus in the states of Telangana, Andhra Pradesh, Tamil Nadu and Kerala.

History 
In a December 2015 interview with Sadhana Chathurvedula of Mint, Vignesh Vellore mentioned that the website has currently hired 12 people to work in it. The News Minute had secured an undisclosed amount of funding from Raghav Bahl's company. They raised second round of undisclosed amount in 2019. It plans to use those funds to hire more reporters and editors as well as expand its coverage. Vignesh Vellore stated that The News Minute aims to make use of User interface (UI) "so as to keep the audience more engaged with the content we publish."

Notable people 
Chitra Subramaniam  Former editor for The Hindu, known for her investigations on the Bofors scandal. She is also an Editorial Adviser for Republic TV.

Awards 

 Geetika Mantri, Senior Editor of The News Minute won Project SIREN Award for journalists for her October 2020 article titled 'How the coverage of Sushant SinghRajput's death was a disservice to mental health reportage'.
 Anna Isaac has won the first prize from the International Committee of the Red Cross, New Delhi and Press Institute of India, Chennai, for her story, "Who gets to live? COVID-19 is causing moral distress among India's doctors", published on May 14, 2021.

References

External links 
 

Indian news websites
Asian news websites
Mass media in Bangalore
Internet properties established in 2014
2014 establishments in Karnataka